Lawrence Glancy was a Scottish footballer who played in the Scottish League for Cowdenbeath, Celtic and Bo'ness as a centre forward.

Personal life 
Glancy was the cousin of footballer Tom Glancy and the uncle of junior footballer Watty Glancy.

Career statistics

References 

Scottish footballers
Scottish Football League players
Scottish Junior Football Association players
1902 births
Year of death missing
Association football forwards
Celtic F.C. players
Bo'ness F.C. players
Cowdenbeath F.C. players
Clackmannan F.C. players
Hearts of Beath F.C. players
People from Cowdenbeath
Footballers from Fife
Scottish expatriates in the United States